Simpiwe Vetyeka (born 24 December 1980) is a South African professional boxer. He is a former WBA (Undisputed) and IBO featherweight champion, as well as a former IBO super bantamweight champion.

Professional career

Vetyeka vs. John
Vetyeka won the WBA Super World featherweight title by defeating Chris John on December 6, 2013, when John retired on his stool after the sixth of twelve rounds. Vetyeka's IBO featherweight title was also on the line. It was John's first professional loss and brought his ten-year WBA title reign to an end, sending him into retirement.

Vetyeka vs. Donaire
Vetyeka fought Filipino Nonito Donaire for the WBA (Super) featherweight title on May 31, 2014 at The Venetian Macao Hotel & Resort's Cotai Arena in Macau of the Special administrative regions in China. Vetyeka was dropped by Donaire in the fourth round after landing his signature left hook. The fight was stopped seconds after the bell for the fifth round rang due to a cut on Donaire's left eye from an accidental headbutt. Vetyeka lost the bout via unanimous technical decision.

Vetyeka vs. Reyes 
On 12 December 2014, Vetyeka faced Arturo Santos Reyes. Vetyeka won the fight via unanimous decision, with the judges scoring it 120-108, 119-111 and 118-112 in favor of Vetyeka.

Vetyeka vs. Puente 
In 28 November 2015, Vetyeka fought and defeated Rodolfo Puente via a fourth round KO.

Vetyeka vs. Tameda 
On 22 April 2016, Vetyeka fought Tsuyoshi Tameda. Vetyeka won the fight via unanimous decision.

Professional boxing record

See also
List of featherweight boxing champions

References

External links

Simpiwe Vetyeka - Profile, News Archive & Current Rankings at Box.Live

1980 births
Living people
People from Mdantsane
Bantamweight boxers
Super-bantamweight boxers
Featherweight boxers
Lightweight boxers
World featherweight boxing champions
World Boxing Association champions
International Boxing Organization champions
South African male boxers
Sportspeople from the Eastern Cape